Poole Town may refer to:

 Poole Town Ward, an electoral ward within the Borough of Poole
 Poole Town F.C., a seventh-tier English football team
Poole Town Centre
Poole Town Hall